Ramakant Khalap (born 5 August 1946) is an Indian politician from Goa, India. Khalap was a member of the 11th Lok Sabha. He is also former deputy Chief Minister of Goa.

Early life

Khalap was born at Mandrem, in Portuguese Goa to a Marathi couple, Dattaram and Satyabhama Khalap. He worked as a school teacher and later as a college lecturer. After this, he completed a law degree, and soon became a famous and successful lawyer of Goa.

Political career

After the death of then Chief Minister of Goa Dayanand Bandodkar, the Maharashtrawadi Gomantak Party put their support behind Khalap to contest the By-Election from the Mandrem Assembly seat left vacant by death of Bandodkar. Bhaie (Elder Brother), as Khalap is affectionately known in Goa, served as in his role in the Mandrem Assembly seat six times, five of them consecutively and then once more after serving in the eleventh Lok Sabha. Khalep was considered the most popular leader of the common man of Goa after Bhau Bandodkar.

After Shashikala Kakodkar left Maharashtrawadi Gomantak Party and joined Indian National Congress, Khalap became leader of  Maharashtrawadi Gomantak Party in Goa Legislative Assembly. Under his leadership, the Maharashtrawadi Gomantak Party rose in prominence rapidly, winning eighteen seats in the subsequent elections.

As recorded by the Supreme Court of India in the cases Dr. Kashinath Jalmi V/s State of Goa and Ravi Naik V/s State of Goa at one time Maharashtrawadi Gomantak Party had clear majority of 25 MLAs in the 40 member Goa Legislative Assembly, however by blatant misuse of his powers under the Anti Defection Law and Constitution of India, the then Governor of Goa did not make Khalap Chief Minister of Goa.

Khalap was Law Minister of India. As Law Minister he enacted the Arbitration Act of India and drafted amendments to The Code of Civil Procedure of India and the Code of Criminal Procedures of India. Khalap introduced the Women's Reservation Bill in the Parliament.

Khalap has been Leader of Opposition of Goa Assembly, President of the Maharashtrawadi Gomantak Party, Deputy Chief Minister of Goa, Finance Minister of Goa, Minister of Water Resources of Goa, Minister of Social Welfare Department of Goa, Minister for Information Technology and Deputy Chairman of the Goa State Planning Board.

There is a school named after him called Ramakant Khalap High School at Mandrem, Goa. He is Chairman of a Multi State Scheduled Co-operative Bank called The Mapusa Urban Co-operative Bank of Goa (Bank of Goa). He formed Bardez Bazaar, a consumers cooperative society to cater needs of consumers of Goa. He was President of the Goa Cricket Association. Ramakant Khalap is actively involved with Konkan Marathi Sahitya Parishad, Samrat Club, Gomantak Marathi Parishad and Kala Academy Goa. Khalap is also a trustee of the Pravara Medical Trust which runs medical and other colleges at Pravaranagar, Maharashtra.

Khalap has several developmental achievements to his credit. As Deputy Chief Minister of Goa and Minister of Social Welfare Department he started Dayanand Social Security Scheme of old age pension which he named after Dayanand Bandodkar.

He was instrumental in forming the Konkan Railway Corporation and start the Konkan Railway along with Prof. Madhu Dandawate, George Fernandes and others. He successfully lead the pro-railway agitation against the opposition to Konkan Railway in Goa.

When Khalap became MP on the first day of the house itself in a speech on reference to the late President of India Neelam Sanjiva Reddy, Khalap demanded that best remembrance for the late President would be completion of a Bridge at Dhargal on NH 17 whose foundation stone was laid by Neelam Sanjiva Reddy.

All the Lok Sabha members were so impressed that Khalap was successful in getting completion of two bridges, one on NH 17 at Dhargal and another one on Chapora river at Mandrem. Khalap, later as a Minister in H. D. Deve Gowda Government was instrumental in getting the International Airport for Goa at Mopa.

As Minister of Water Resources of Goa, Khalap completed River Linkage project, linking all the rivers and water bodies and further brought water of Tillari Irrigation Project to Goa ending water shortage of Goa.

Khalap got created the Information Technology Department for Govt. of Goa and was the first IT Minister of Goa. All the notable work of Goa in IT sector is due to Bhaie, even when he was in opposition, Khalap secured interest of ordinary Goans in every field.

As a strong Marathi supporter Khalap secured interest of Marathi in the language issue as official language of the State of Goa, in the Goa Official Languages Act, though Khalap was leader of opposition at the time and the ruling congress party was in favour of Konkani. On language issue Khalap is of the opinion that Marathi, Konkani with Davnagari script and Konkani with Roman script, all three should be official languages of Goa and that primary education should be in mother tongue with one paper of English.

Khalap's tenure as Law Minister was so successful that the Pramod Mahajan famously said that, he is a member of the single largest party in the parliament and he is in opposition".......And He is Mr. Ramakanth Khalap, he is the only member of his party and he is the Government."This is what democracy in India is!

Khalap is a senior leader of Indian National Congress and a member of All India Congress Committee (AICC). Khalap is also a GPCC Executive Committee member, member of Manifesto Implementation Committee and Spokesman of Goa Pradesh Congress.

For a short while he joined BJP when circumstances were such that BJP rule in Goa was inevitable due to pressure of BJP government at centre.  Khalap famously explained it to his supporters as 'Bachenge to aur ladenge'.

Khalap is a freedom fighter who started his political career as an aid to other freedom fighters working for liberation of Goa from Portuguese rule. He is considered a politician of old block, a non-corrupt principled politician. His opponents, though tried to falsely implicate him, on one hand, people of Goa have continued to keep faith in Khalap, on the other hand, those opposing Khalap are themselves found to be charge-sheeted for scams and corruption.

Khalap was also the Chairman of the Goa State Law Commission with Cabinet Minister Rank. As the Chairman of the Law Commission, Goa he drafted bills to make revolutionary changes in Revenue Administration and Revenue Courts in the State of Goa. He also worked on amendment of Portuguese laws of Goa along with other members of the Law Commission.

Khalap is the Founder Chairman of the International Arbitration Centre Goa.

Personal life 

Khalap is a Maratha by caste. He is married to Nirmala Khalap and has three sons, Shriniwas (lawyer) married to Shraddha Khalap who contested the 2017 Goa Legislative Assembly election on Aam Aadmi Party ticket from Mapusa constituency; Nikhilchandra (Civil engineer) married to Pratiksha (a doctor and clinical researcher by profession); and Ashwin (hotelier). Khalap has a granddaughter Anahita and 3 grandsons named Ojas, Jaikeshi and Om.

References

External links 
 http://www.goanews.com/blogs_disp.php?uid=8
 http://goalawcommission.gov.in/

Living people
1947 births
Members of the Goa Legislative Assembly
India MPs 1996–1997
Lok Sabha members from Goa
Law Ministers of India
Deputy chief ministers of Goa
People from North Goa district
Bharatiya Janata Party politicians from Goa
Maharashtrawadi Gomantak Party politicians
Indian National Congress politicians from Goa
Leaders of the Opposition in Goa
Union ministers of state of India